JLHS may refer to:
 James Logan High School, Union City, California, United States
 Jayhawk-Linn High School, Mound City, Kansas, United States
 Jinling High School, Nanjing, Jiangsu, China
 Jonathan Law High School, Milford, Connecticut, United States
 Juarez-Lincoln High School, Mission, Texas, United States